Gametophores are prominent structures in seedless plants on which the reproductive organs are borne.  The word gametophore  and ‘-phore’ (Greek Φορά, "to be carried"). In mosses, liverworts and ferns (Archegoniata), the gametophores support gametangia (sex organs, female archegonia and male antheridia). If both archegonia and antheridia occur on the same plant, it is called monoecious. If there are separate female and male plants they are called dioecous.

In Bryopsida the leafy moss plant (q. v. "Thallus") is the haploid gametophyte. It grows from its juvenile form, the protonema, under the influence of phytohormones (mainly cytokinins).  Whereas the filamentous protonema grows by apical cell division, the gametophyte grows by division of three-faced apical cells.

References 

Plant morphology